Tiramolla is an Italian comic book character created in 1952 by Roberto Renzi and Giorgio Rebuffi.

Tiramolla (English: Stretch-Spring) is a bizarre Superhero that resembles a stick figure with extensible slender body, oval face, long legs, a cylindrical head and a bow. Tiramolla has acquired the unique ability of being able to stretch as he wishes, even for several kilometers, after falling into a large container of rubber.

He appeared for the first time in August 1952 as a supporting character in the comic series Cucciolo e Beppe, in the magazine Cucciolo, in the story "Il mistero della villa" (trad. "Mystery of the Villa"). The first cartoonist was Giorgio Rebuffi.

On 15 July 1959, Tiramolla became the star of an independent magazine of the same name, published by Edizioni Alpe. Umberto Manfrin joined Rebuffi in the role of writer, and later also became cartoonist with the pseudonym of Mamberto. New characters were introduced: the butler Saetta, Ullaò the dog, the "Admiral", Caucciù, the Tiramolla's grandson in possession of the same powers of his uncle, the villain Mister Magic and other characters of satirical inspiration such as the accountant Rossi (that symbolize the Italian pedantic) and the Devil's Advocate (inspired by Perry Mason).

At the regular series there were flanked almanacs, collections and reprints in an intense schedule of weekly, monthly and quarterly releases.

At the end of 1980s, after the editor Giuseppe Caregaro's death, Tiramolla ended its publications. Shortly later, at the beginning of 1990, Tiramolla was re-launched under a new publisher, Vallardi, but the magazine failed to regain the ancient success and finally closed in the middle of 1993.

Also in 1992 Dan Videos produced Tiramolla Adventures, an animated series directed by Giuseppe Laganà.

References

Further reading

External links 
 Unofficial website

Italian comics titles
Italian comics characters
Satirical comics
Comics characters introduced in 1952
Comics superheroes
Male characters in advertising
Male characters in comics
Mascots introduced in 1952
1952 comics debuts
Fictional characters who can change size
Fictional characters who can stretch themselves
Comics adapted into animated series
Comics adapted into television series
Magazine mascots
Comics magazines published in Italy
1959 comics debuts
1993 comics endings
Magazines established in 1959
Magazines disestablished in 1993
Italian-language magazines
Defunct magazines published in Italy
Italian superheroes